Vedran Zrnić (born 26 September 1979) is a Croatian professional handball player for Nexe Našice. He is World champion from 2003, and Olympic champion from 2004 with the Croatia national team. He received a silver medal at the 2005 World championship.

He was born in Zagreb, on 26 September 1979.

Honours
Badel 1862 Zagreb
Croatian First League (5): 1996-97, 1997-98, 1998-99, 1999-00, 2000-01
Croatian Cup (4): 1997, 1998, 1999, 2000
EHF Champions League runner-up (3): 1997, 1998, 1999

Prule 67 Ljubljana
Slovenian First League (1): 2001-02
Slovenian Cup (1): 2002

Gorenje Velenje
Slovenian First League runner-up (1): 2004-05

VfL Gummersbach
EHF Cup Winners' Cup (1): 2010, 2011
EHF Cup (1): 2009
EHF Champions Trophy runner-up (1): 2006

Beşiktaş
Turkish Super League (1): 2014-15
Turkish Cup (1): 2015
Turkish President's Cup (1): 2014

Individual
Franjo Bučar State Award for Sport - 2004
3rd top goalscorer of Croatian national team

Orders
Order of Danica Hrvatska with face of Franjo Bučar - 2004

References

External links 
 

1979 births
Living people
Croatian male handball players
Olympic handball players of Croatia
Handball players at the 2004 Summer Olympics
Olympic gold medalists for Croatia
RK Zagreb players
Olympic medalists in handball
Medalists at the 2004 Summer Olympics
Beşiktaş J.K. Handball Team players
Expatriate handball players in Turkey

Mediterranean Games gold medalists for Croatia
Competitors at the 2001 Mediterranean Games
Mediterranean Games medalists in handball